Cobosella laesicollis is a species of beetle in the family Buprestidae, the only species in the genus Cobosella.

References

Monotypic Buprestidae genera